The Berry Motor Car Service Building, at 2220 Washington Ave in St. Louis, Missouri, was built in 1937.  It was listed on the National Register of Historic Places in 2010.  The listing included two contributing buildings.

The one-story building served as an automobile service facility for the Berry Motor Car Company (also known as the Halsey-Packard Building) at 2201-2211 Locust Street (also listed on the National Register).

It was designed by architect Otto Krieg and built by contractor John W. Morrison.

References

		
National Register of Historic Places in St. Louis
Early Commercial architecture in the United States
Buildings and structures completed in 1937